Ab Shirin (also Romanized as Āb Shīrīn, Āb-e Shīrīn, and Āb-i-Shirīn) is a village in Miyandasht Rural District, in the Central District of Kashan County, Isfahan Province, Iran. At the 2006 census, its population was 992, in 265 families.

References 

Populated places in Kashan County